Hole in the Sky may refer to:
 Hole in the Sky (festival), a metal music festival held in Bergen, Norway
 "Hole in the Sky" (song), a song by Black Sabbath from their 1975 album Sabotage
 "Hole in the Sky" (Voltron: Legendary Defender), an episode of Voltron: Legendary Defender

See also
 Black hole
 Ozone hole, the polar holes in the ozone layer